H-block or h-block may refer to:

H Block, a compilation album by various Irish folk artists
 H Block (Hong Kong), a 1970s block design in Hong Kong
 H engine, an internal combustion engine having the cylinders in an H pattern
 Maze (HM Prison), Belfast, where the prison blocks were built to a uniform H-shaped plan
 Anti H-Block, 1981 Irish Republican election label

 H-block in aggressive inline skating, part of the frame of the skate
 The 1915–1920 and 1995–2000 MHz radio frequency bands, used for wireless broadband communications; see

See also
 H-Blockx, German hardcore punk band